Ada Ignatievna Voytsik (1 August 19052 September 1982) was a Soviet actress. In 1935 she received the title RSFSR Honored Artist.

Biography
Ada Ignatievna Voytsik was born on 1 August 1905 in Moscow. 

In 1923 Ada graduated from secondary school and entered the acting department of the State College of Cinematography (today known as VGIK), where she graduated in 1927.

She started acting in cinema in the year 1925. In 1934 Ada Voytsik joined the staff of the Mosfilm film studio.

She married director Ivan Pyryev and they had a son, Eric Pyryev (1931-1970), who also subsequently became a director.

In 1941 together with the studio she was evacuated to Alma-Ata.

On her return to Moscow in 1943, Ada became an actress at the National Film Actors' Theatre, where she worked until her retirement in 1961.

In the last years of her life, Ada Voytsik did not appear in films.

Ada Voytsik lived through the death of her son and Ivan Pyryev. She died in Moscow on 2 September 1982 at the age of 77, and was buried in the Khovanskoye Cemetery.

Selected filmography
All the King's Men (TV mini-series) (1971)
Vyzyvaem ogon na sebya (TV mini-series) (1963)
Nine Days in One Year (1962) as Maria Tikhonovna
Sampo (1959) as Mother of Lemminkäinen
Rozhdyonnye burey (1958) as Yadviga Rayevskaya
Puti i sudby (1955) as Maria Vasilyevna
Attack from the Sea (1952) as Queen Carolina
Ivan the Terrible (1944) as Elena Glinskaya
Dream (1943) as Vanda
The Murderers are Coming (1942) as Marta
The Oppenheim Family (1939) as Liselotte Lavendal Oppenheim
The Happy Canary (1929) as Lugovec' wife
Ukhod za bolnym (1929) as Nurse
Svoi i chuzhiye (1928) as Shura
The House on Trubnaya (1928) as Fenya
The Doll With Millions (1928) as Maria Ivanova
Bulat-Batır (1928) as Asma
The Forty-First (1927 film) as Maryutka
Raznostoronniy treugolnik (1927) as Wifey

References

External links

Soviet film actresses
Soviet silent film actresses 
Actresses from Moscow
1905 births
1982 deaths